Charles William Stubbs DD (3 September 18454 May 1912) was an English clergyman.

He was born in Liverpool and educated at the Liverpool Collegiate Institution and Sidney Sussex College, Cambridge. As a clergyman he held several incumbencies, among them rector at Wavertree and Granborough. He took a great interest in the working classes and in social subjects, and was liberal both in his political and in his theological opinions. He was Dean of Ely 1894 to 1906 when he was appointed the fourth Bishop of Truro.

His daughter Meriel married the organist and composer Thomas Tertius Noble.

Quotations 
"To sit alone with my conscience will be judgment enough for me."

Selected works 
 God and the People: the religious creed of a democrat, being selections from the writings of Joseph Mazzini; 2nd ed. 1896; G W E Russell, A Pocketful of Sixpences, London 1907, p 92
 Co-operation & Owenite Socialist Communities/The Land and the Labourers (1884)
 The Land and the Labourers (1893)
 Charles Kingsley and the Christian Social Movement (1899)
 Social Teachings of the Lord's Prayer (1900)
 In a Minster Garden: A Causerie (1902)
 Castles in the Air. And Other Poems Old and New. ( Dent, 1903) The Christ of English Poetry (1906)
 Cambridge and its Story (1912)
 Hymns, including Christ was born on Christmas Night and Carol of King Cnut''

References

External links

 
 

1845 births
1912 deaths
Bishops of Truro
Alumni of Sidney Sussex College, Cambridge
Clergy from Liverpool
Deans of Ely
20th-century Church of England bishops

19th-century Anglican theologians
20th-century Anglican theologians
Anglican hymnwriters
English Christian socialists